Petr Michalek (born 19 August 1989) is a Czech male volleyball player. He is part of the Czech Republic men's national volleyball team. On club level he plays for Jihostroj České Budějovice.

References

External links
Profile at FIVB.org

1989 births
Living people
Czech men's volleyball players
Place of birth missing (living people)